The people of Eddaland, known as the Eddics, are  often misconstrued a sub-group of the Igbo people in south-eastern Nigeria. The land and people of Eddaland have been constitutionally designated the present day Afikpo South Local Government Area of Ebonyi State, Nigeria.

References

Sources
 Egbebu progressive union
 Edda women wing Enugu
 

Ethnic groups in Nigeria
Igbo subgroups